Ienaga is both a Japanese surname (written:) and a masculine Japanese given name. Notable people with the name include:

Last name
Akihiro Ienaga (born 1986), Japanese footballer
Saburō Ienaga (1913–2002), Japanese historian

First name
Minamoto no Ienaga (1170 – 1234), Japanese waka poet 
Naitō Ienaga (1546–1600), Japanese samurai
Ikoma Ienaga (died 1607), Japanese samurai

Japanese-language surnames
Japanese masculine given names